Salir is a village and civil parish (freguesia) located in the municipality of Loulé, Portugal. The population in 2011 was 2,775, in an area of 187.75 km². Situated away from the coast, Salir is known by its castle. There are two churches in Salir. Salir is close to the village of Alte.

Climate

References

Freguesias of Loulé